Alejandro Schell (born 9 Oct 1897 in Tiraspol; died 1972) was a Bessarabia German clergyman and bishop for the Roman Catholic Diocese of Lomas de Zamora. He became ordained in 1922. He was appointed bishop in 1958.

References

Moldovan Roman Catholic bishops
1897 births
1972 deaths
People from Tiraspol
Roman Catholic bishops of Lomas de Zamora